Western Cemetery may refer to:

 Vestre gravlund,
 Western Cemetery (Portland, Maine)
 Western Cemetery (Cardiff)
 Western Cemetery (Cheshunt)
 Western Cemetery (Dundee)
 Western Cemetery, Kingston upon Hull